Follicular atrophoderma is a skin condition consisting of follicular indentations without hairs, notably occurring on extensor surfaces of the hands, legs and arms.

See also
 Skin lesion
 List of cutaneous conditions

References

External links 

Genodermatoses